Seryozha (published 1955) is a short novel by Soviet writer Vera Panova. Seryozha has also been translated as Time Walked and A Summer to Remember. Seryozha is a diminutive form of the name Sergey.

Plot
Seryozha is the story of a young boy living in the rural Soviet Union in the mid-1950s. The novel describes Seryozha's experiences, and those of his family, friends and neighbors over the course of a summer. The most important event of the story is the marriage of Seryozha's mother to a Red Army veteran named Dmitry Korostelyev. Korostelyev becomes the new manager of the local collective farm and a strong role model for Seryozha. Throughout the novel Panova gives a relatively grim picture of life in the rural Soviet Union where both money and opportunity are scarce. The novel ends with Korostelyev being reassigned to a new collective farm in the remote Arkhangelsky District, and taking the family with him.

Quote
Panova said of the genesis of Seryozha:
<blockquote>"The soul of a child was revealed to me, the revelation engendered reflection, my reflections became clothed in images- and there appeared Seryozha."</blockquote>

English translationsTime Walked, Harvill Press, 1957.A Summer to Remember, Thomas Yoseloff, 1962.Selected Works, Progress Publishers, Moscow, 1976.

Screen version
The story was brought to the screen in the 1960 film Seryozha'' by Georgi Daneliya and Igor Talankin.

References

1955 novels
Soviet novels
Novels set in Russia